Giulio Viozzi (born Trieste, 5 July 1912 – died Verona, 29 November 1984) was an Italian composer, conductor, pianist, and music critic. Among his compositions are numerous operas, ballets, and symphonic works, as well as some chamber music and songs.

References
Brief biography at trieste.com (in Italian)

1912 births
1984 deaths
Italian classical composers
Italian male classical composers
Italian classical pianists
Male classical pianists
Italian male pianists
Italian male conductors (music)
Italian music critics
Italian male non-fiction writers
Italian opera composers
Male opera composers
Musicians from Trieste
20th-century Italian conductors (music)
20th-century classical composers
20th-century classical pianists
20th-century Italian composers
20th-century Italian male musicians